NorthWest Arkansas Community College (NWACC) is a public community college with its main campus in Bentonville, Arkansas. Total enrollment for the fall semester of 2018 was 8,308.

History

NWACC was founded by voters in the Bentonville and Rogers Public School Districts on August 15, 1989, when they passed by a 65-percent margin a 3-mill property tax to support the new institution. NWACC opened its doors to 1,200 students in August 1990 and has in excess of 8,300 college credit students (Fall 2018), making it one of the largest and fastest growing two-year colleges in Arkansas. An additional 7,000 students are served by non-credit courses throughout the service area.

In the early days, NWACC was known as the "College without walls" because it solved the problem of not having enough "bricks and mortar" funding to build classrooms by conducting classes in a variety of buildings throughout the community.

Faculty often had to transport learning materials, equipment, and even laboratory specimen in their personal vehicles from one location to another to meet with students.

Academics
Northwest Arkansas Community College offers many areas of study leading to associate degrees. and also provides the option to take online classes. NWACC is accredited by the Higher Learning Commission. As of 2019 NWACC operates a Transition Academic Program with the University of Arkansas to allow students to enroll, take courses and share credits at both schools, while simultaneously pursuing an associate degree at NWACC and a bachelor's degree at the University of Arkansas.

Campuses and locations

Main campus 

The main campus of Northwest Arkansas Community College is located directly off of highway I-49. The main campus includes ShewMaker Center for Global Business Development, Center for Health Professions, and a nature preserve.

Brightwater Culinary School 
After beginning as the culinary program within NWACC, Brightwater was officially launched in early 2017 as separate operational entity, while still being a part of NWACC. The college is known for its emphasis on local food culture and the development of the "High South Cuisine" concept, which focuses on local, farm to table approach.

Brightwater officially opened in the 8th Street Market district of Bentonville within a former Tyson Foods chicken processing plant, allowing the enrollment to grow from a few dozen students to a maximum of 350.

The Brightwater facility and the 8th Street Market won the American Institute of Architects Central Excellence in Design award for 2017.

Washington County Center

The Washington County Center in Springdale opened in 2019, consolidating operations from other sites in Springdale and Farmington at the new building near Arvest Ballpark and Arkansas Children's Hospital Northwest. The Washington County Center site in west Springdale was selected to improve access for the 36% of NWACC students residing in Washington County, as well as Siloam Springs students. The new building contains 14 classrooms, three labs, and an event space. A nursing simulation lab will increase the size of the nursing program.

Clubs and organizations
There are 23 registered student organizations on campus including honor societies, business, special interest, religious, international and cultural organizations, and many more.
The Student Ambassador and Government Association (SAGA) is the student body leadership organization which aims to represent both NWACC and NWACC students. Members host several student events each year, are student advocates, and also work with NWACC staff, faculty, administration to help make the student experience better.

References

External links 

 Official website

 
Educational institutions established in 1989
1989 establishments in Arkansas
Buildings and structures in Bentonville, Arkansas
Education in Benton County, Arkansas
Community colleges in Arkansas
Springdale, Arkansas
Bentonville, Arkansas